is one of the Satsunan Islands, classed with the Amami archipelago between Kyūshū and Okinawa.|

The island, 9.35  km² in area, has a population of approximately 140 persons, and is administered as the town of Setouchi, Kagoshima, on neighboring Amami-Oshima. Much of the island is within the borders of the Amami Guntō Quasi-National Park.

Geography
Yorojima is the smallest inhabited island in the Amami archipelago, and is located offshore to the south of Amami-Ōshima, from which it can be reached by ferry in 80 minutes. The island is noted for a high population density of habu poisonous vipers.

Climate
Yorojima has a humid subtropical climate (Köppen climate classification Cfa) with very warm summers and mild winters. Precipitation is significant throughout the year, but is somewhat lower in winter. The island is subject to frequent typhoons.

History
After the Meiji Restoration the island was incorporated into Ōsumi Province and later became part of Kagoshima Prefecture. Following World War II, although with the other Amami Islands, it was occupied by the United States until 1953, at which time it reverted to the control of Japan.

References

National Geospatial Intelligence Agency (NGIA). Prostar Sailing Directions 2005 Japan Enroute. Prostar Publications (2005).

External links

Amami Islands
Islands of Kagoshima Prefecture